Liu Yuxiang (born October 11, 1975 in Hengyang, Hunan) is a Chinese judoka who competed in the 2000 Summer Olympics and in the 2004 Summer Olympics.

She won the bronze medal in the half lightweight class in 2000. Four years later she was eliminated in the round of 16 of the lightweight class.

References

External links
 
 
 
 profile

1975 births
Living people
Judoka at the 2000 Summer Olympics
Judoka at the 2004 Summer Olympics
Olympic bronze medalists for China
Olympic judoka of China
People from Hengyang
Olympic medalists in judo
Sportspeople from Hunan
Chinese female judoka
Medalists at the 2000 Summer Olympics
20th-century Chinese women
21st-century Chinese women